Stary Korczyn  is a village in the administrative district of Gmina Nowy Korczyn, within Busko County, Świętokrzyskie Voivodeship, in south-central Poland. The village has a population of 304.

Stary Korczyn was the subject of a well-known painting from World War I, Erstürmung des Dorfes Stary Korczyn durch das Landsturminfanterieregiment Nr. 1, 22. Dez. 1914 (Attack on the Village of Stary Korczyn by the Vienna First Infantry Regiment on December 22, 1914), by Alfred Basel, now hanging in the Heeresgeschichtliches Museum, Vienna.

References

Stary Korczyn